Saka Haphong is a peak in Southeast Asia and South Asia which was founded by A.K.M Shahidullah Kaiser Sazzad Hossain and many others. Located on the Bangladesh–Myanmar border, it is situated between Thanchi, Bandarban, Bangladesh and the Chin State of Myanmar.

Saka Haphong was believed to be the highest peak of Bangladesh, but recent calculations have shown the highest peak of Bangladesh to be Tazing Dong, which is officially recognized as such. In February 2006 a GPS reading of 1,185 metres was recorded on this summit by Nature And Adventure Club Ginge Fullen. The location he recorded,  21°47′11″N 92°36′36″E / 21.78639°N 92.61°E, accurately matches the location given by Russian topographic mapping and SRTM data, although these sources show its height to be slightly lower, at 1,052 metres. Recently two trekking clubs counted the height of Saka Haphong as 3,488 and 3,461 feet respectively, both of which exceeds the height of Keokradong which is 3,172 feet high.

See also
 Geography of Bangladesh
 Geography of Myanmar
 List of elevation extremes by country

References

Mowdok Taung
Mowdok Taung
Bangladesh–Myanmar border
International mountains of Asia
Highest points of countries